Greg Roberts may refer to:
 Gregory David Roberts (born 1952), Australian author
 Greg Roberts (American football) (born 1956), American football player
 Greg Roberts (designer) (born 1969), American artist and entrepreneur
 Greg Roberts (musician) (born 1958), former drummer for Big Audio Dynamite